Qualification for 2015 All England Super Series Premier was held on 3 March 2015.

Men's Single

Seeds

  Dionysius Hayom Rumbaka
  Boonsak Ponsana
  Xue Song
  Chong Wei Feng (withdrew)

Qualifying draw

First qualifier

Second qualifier

Third qualifier

Fourth qualifier

Women's Single

Seeds

Qualifying draw

First qualifier

Second qualifier

Third qualifier

Fourth qualifier

Men's doubles

Seeds

Qualifying draw

First qualifier

Second qualifier

Third qualifier

Fourth qualifier

Women's doubles

Seeds

Qualifying draw

First qualifier

Second qualifier

Third qualifier

Fourth qualifier

Mixed doubles

Seeds

Qualifying draw

First qualifier

Second qualifier

Third qualifier

Fourth qualifier

References
Original Draw Results (10 Feb 2015)
MS Qualification Results
WS Qualification Results
MD Qualification Results
WD Qualification Results
XD Qualification Results

2015 BWF Super Series
All England Open Badminton Championships